Richard Reid Ingrams (born 19 August 1937) is an English journalist, a co-founder and second editor of the British satirical magazine Private Eye, and founding editor of The Oldie magazine. He left the latter job at the end of May 2014.

Early life and education

Ingrams's parents, who had three other sons including the banker and opera impresario Leonard Ingrams, were Leonard St Clair Ingrams (1900–1953), O.B.E., an investment banker from a clergy family, who worked as a government official in propaganda, economic warfare and the secret services during World War II, and Victoria, the daughter of Sir James Reid, private physician to Queen Victoria. Through his maternal grandmother and her ties to the Baring family, Ingrams is a direct descendant of the 19th-century prime minister Earl Grey.

Ingrams was educated at the independent preparatory school West Downs in Winchester, Hampshire, followed by Shrewsbury School, where he met Willie Rushton and edited the school magazine. Before attending Oxford, he did his National Service in the army ranks after failing his interview for officer training, something which was unusual for someone from his background at the time. At University College, Oxford, where he read Classics, he shared tutorials with Robin Butler, later Cabinet Secretary and sometimes referred to as a "pillar of the Establishment". More importantly, he met Paul Foot, another former Shrewsbury pupil not yet the left-wing radical he became, who was to be a lifelong friend, and whose biography Ingrams wrote after Foot's death.

Career
Along with several other Old Salopians, including Willie Rushton, Ingrams founded Private Eye in 1962, taking over the editorship from Christopher Booker in 1963. It was a classic case, he claimed on Desert Island Discs in 2008, of the "old boy network". Private Eye was part of the satire boom of the early 1960s, which included the television show That Was The Week That Was, for which Ingrams wrote, and The Establishment nightclub, run by Peter Cook. When Private Eye ran into financial problems Cook was able to gain a majority shareholding on the proceeds of his brief but financially successful venture.

Ingrams vacated the editor's chair at the Eye in 1986, when Ian Hislop took over. In 1992 Ingrams created and became editor of The Oldie, a now monthly humorous lifestyle and issues magazine mainly aimed at the older generation. As of 2005 he was still chairman of Private Eye, working there every Monday, spending four days a week in London.

He was television critic for The Spectator from 1976 to 1984, though he rarely showed much enthusiasm for the medium. He was a regular on the radio panel quiz The News Quiz for its first twenty years and contributed a column to The Observer for eighteen years. In late 2005 he moved to The Independent, considering The Observer to have gone downhill, particularly as a consequence of its support for the Iraq war. In his 27 August 2011 column, he announced that he had been sacked by the newly appointed editor of The Independent. Shortly after the death of Jimmy Savile, Ingrams' The Oldie was the first publication to break the story of Savile's history of child abuse, after several national newspapers had been unwilling to print it.

After a series of clashes with James Pembroke, owner and publisher of The Oldie, Ingrams left the magazine at the end of May 2014 having resigned as editor. His most recent book is a biography of Ludovic Kennedy.

Personal life
Ingrams married Mary Morgan on 24 November 1962; they had three children: a son, Fred, who is an artist; a second son, Arthur, who was disabled and died in childhood; and a daughter, Margaret ("Jubby") a mother of three who died in 2004, aged 39, of a heroin overdose in Brighton.

Ingrams played the organ for many years in his local Anglican church in Aldworth, Berkshire, each Sunday. The Romney Marsh Historic Churches Trust was formed under the patronage of Ingrams and the then Archbishop of Canterbury, Robert Runcie. In 2011 he announced he had converted to Roman Catholicism.

Ingrams currently lives in Berkshire with his wife (who is also his god-daughter) Sara, a medical researcher. Before they married in 2011 he had a “long-term partner, Debbie Bosley, a waitress-turned novelist 27 years his junior” 

His sister-in-law (wife of his late brother Rupert, a publisher) was Davina Ingrams, 18th Baroness Darcy de Knayth; his nephew Caspar is the present baron.

A biography, Richard Ingrams: Lord of the Gnomes by Harry Thompson, was published in 1994.

Books by Ingrams

As author

 Mrs Wilson's Diary (with John Wells) 1965
 Mrs Wilson's Second Diary (with John Wells) 1966
 Mrs Wilson's Diaries (with John Wells) 1967
 The Tale of Driver Grope (with Ralph Steadman) 1969
 The Bible for Motorists: By Old Jowett (with Barry Fantoni) 1970
 Harris in Wonderland: By Philip Reid (pseudonym of Ingrams and Andrew Osmond) 1973
 God's Apology: A Chronicle of Three Friends 1977
 Goldenballs 1979
 Dear Bill: The Collected Letters of Denis Thatcher (with John Wells) 1980
 Romney Marsh and the Royal Military Canal (with Fay Godwin) 1980
 The Other Half: Further Letters of Denis Thatcher (with John Wells) 1981
 One for the Road (with John Wells) 1982
 Piper's Places: John Piper in England & Wales (with John Piper) 1983
 My Round! (with John Wells) 1983
 Bottoms Up! (with John Wells) 1984
 Down the Hatch! (with John Wells) 1985
 John Stewart Collis: A Memoir 1986
 Just the One (with John Wells) 1986
 The Best of "Dear Bill" (with John Wells) 1986
 Mud in Your Eye! (with John Wells) 1987
 You Might as Well be Dead 1988
 Still Going Strong (with John Wells) 1988
 The Ridgeway: Europe's Oldest Road 1988
 Number 10 (with John Wells) 1989
 On and On (with John Wells) 1990
 Muggeridge: The Biography 1995
 My Friend Footy: A Memoir of Paul Foot 2005
 The Life and Adventures of William Cobbett 2005
 Quips and Quotes: A Journalist's Commonplace Book 2011
 Ludo and the Power of the Book: Ludovic Kennedy's Campaigns for Justice 2017
 The Sins of G. K. Chesterton 2021

As compiler and editor

 What the Papers Never Meant to Say: "Private Eye's" Second Book of Boobs 1968
 The Life and Times of Private Eye 1961–1971 1971
 Beachcomber: The Works of J. B. Morton 1974
 Cobbett's Country Book: An Anthology of William Cobbett's Writings on Country Matters 1974
 "Private Eye's" Book of Pseuds: A Mood Statement 1975
 "Private Eye's" Second Book of Pseuds 1977
 The Penguin Book of Private Eye Cartoons 1983
 Dr Johnson by Mrs Thrale: The "Anecdotes" of Mrs Piozzi in Their Original Form 1984
 England: An Anthology 1989
 The Bumper Beachcomber 1991
 The Oldie Book of Cartoons 1996
 More Cartoons 1996
 I Once Met: Fifty Encounters with the Famous 1996
 Jesus: Authors Take Sides: An Anthology 1999
 The Oldie Book of Cartoons, 1992–2009 2009
 The Oldie Book of Cartoons: A New Selection 2013

References

External links
 Richard Ingrams interview

1937 births
Military personnel from London
20th-century British Army personnel
20th-century British journalists
21st-century British journalists
Alumni of University College, Oxford
British Army soldiers
British magazine founders
Converts to Roman Catholicism from Anglicanism
English Roman Catholics
English magazine editors
English male journalists
English radio personalities
Living people
People educated at Shrewsbury School
People educated at West Downs School
People from Chelsea, London
Private Eye contributors
The Independent people
The Observer people
The Spectator people
Writers from London